Estádio Municipal do Tafe is a multi-use stadium in Cabinda, Angola.  It is currently used mostly for football matches and serves as the home of Sporting de Cabinda. The stadium holds 5,000 people.

References

Tafe